Equestrian competitions at the 2019 Pan American Games in Lima, Peru were held from July 27 to August 10. The venue for the competition is the Equestrian Club Militar La Molina. A total of 150 athletes are scheduled to compete in the three disciplines of dressage, eventing and jumping, each with an individual and team event.

All three disciplines served as qualifiers for the 2020 Summer Olympics in Tokyo, Japan.

Medal table

Medalists

Qualification

A quota of 150 equestrian riders (48 dressage, 48 eventing and 54 show jumping) will be allowed to qualify. A maximum of 12 athletes can compete for a nation across all events (with a maximum of four per discipline). Athletes qualified through various qualifying events and rankings.

See also
Equestrian at the 2020 Summer Olympics

References

External links
Results book

 
Equestrian
2019
2019 in equestrian